Jeremy Jordan may refer to:

 Jeremy Jordan (actor, born 1984), American actor and singer, notable for being an actor and Broadway performer
 Jeremy Jordan (singer, born 1973), American actor and singer, notable for songs in the 1990s such as "The Right Kind of Love"